Jordy Reid (born 3 October 1991) is an Australian rugby union footballer who plays in the Premiership Rugby as a flanker for Gloucester.

His performances during his debut season saw him sign a new contract which will keep him in Melbourne until 2015.

In the summer of 2018, Reid travelled  to England to join Ealing Trailfinders in the RFU Championship from the 2018–19 season.

On 20 February 2020, Reid has signed for Gloucester in the Premiership Rugby from the 2020–21 season. He has since signed a contract extension.

Super Rugby statistics

References

External links
 Melbourne Rebels profile

Living people
1991 births
Australian rugby union players
Rugby union flankers
Rugby union players from Sydney
Melbourne Rebels players
Melbourne Rising players
Ealing Trailfinders Rugby Club players
Australian expatriate rugby union players
Expatriate rugby union players in England
Gloucester Rugby players